Andriy Yahodka (also spelled Yagodka, ; born 6 July 1988) is a Ukrainian sabre fencer, bronze medal in the 2012 European Fencing Championships and team silver medal in the 2009 European Fencing Championships. In the 2014–15 season he posted his first World Cup medal with a silver in Padova after being defeated in the final by Russia's Kamil Ibragimov.

References

External links
 
  (archive)
 
 
 

1988 births
Sportspeople from Odesa
Living people
Armed Forces sports society (Ukraine) athletes
Ukrainian male sabre fencers
Fencers at the 2015 European Games
European Games medalists in fencing
European Games gold medalists for Ukraine
Fencers at the 2016 Summer Olympics
Olympic fencers of Ukraine
Universiade medalists in fencing
Universiade gold medalists for Ukraine
Medalists at the 2011 Summer Universiade